A Son from America may refer to:

 A Son from America (1924 film), a 1925 French silent comedy film
 A Son from America (1932 film), a 1932 French-Hungarian comedy drama film